The 9mm Winchester Magnum, which is also known as the 9×29mm, is a centerfire handgun cartridge developed by Winchester in the late 1970s. The cartridge was developed to duplicate the performance of the .357 S&W Magnum in an auto-pistol cartridge.

The first handgun which chambered the cartridge was the Wildey pistol. Since then, Thompson/Center and LAR (Grizzly) have produced barrels chambered for this cartridge and AMT chambered their Automag III for it too, but the cartridge never reached the popularity enjoyed by other handgun cartridges.

Starline Brass in Sedalia, Missouri, still make brass for this cartridge, although much of its production is now used to make 9mm blank firing cartridges for firearms chambered for 9×19mm, as this is easier to accomplish than using .223 Remington (5.56×45mm) cases, which may leave the neck area of the blank too thick to crimp properly. 9mm Winchester Magnum cases can also be trimmed and resized for reloading 9×25mm Mauser.

See also
Glossary of firearms terminology
List of handgun cartridges

References

Pistol and rifle cartridges
Winchester Repeating Arms Company cartridges